The 1954 British Grand Prix was a Formula One motor race held at Silverstone on 17 July 1954. It was race 5 of 9 in the 1954 World Championship of Drivers. The 90-lap race was won by Ferrari driver José Froilán González after he started from second position. His teammate Mike Hawthorn finished second and Maserati driver Onofre Marimón came in third.

Race report 
A huge crowd turned out at Silverstone to see if Mercedes could repeat their Reims rout. In the end, just two silver cars arrived (for Fangio and Kling). In contrast, Maserati had nine cars, whilst Ferrari had three for the experienced trio of Hawthorn, Gonzalez and Trintignant. Fangio set Silverstone's fastest ever lap, breaking the 100 mph barrier with a lap of 100.35 mph. It was Gonzalez who led away and held the lead until the flag. Behind him, Fangio passed Hawthorn for second but after colliding several times with oil drums in a difficult handling car, he dropped to fourth. Moss took over the position but retired with rear axle problems, leaving Hawthorn to follow home for a Ferrari 1–2 and young Onofre Marimón to take his second (and last) podium place.

Classification

Qualifying 

 — Rodney Nuckey, named substitute driver for Eric Brandon in the #30 Cooper-Bristol, was given a starting position despite not completing a single lap in qualifying or in the race.

Race 

Notes
 – Ascari, Behra, Fangio, González, Hawthorn, Marimón & Moss all set the equal fastest lap time of 1:50. Each received  of a point.

Shared drives
 Car #6: Bira (42 laps) then Flockhart (2 laps)
 Car #32: Villoresi (30 laps) then Ascari (10 laps)

Championship standings after the race 
Drivers' Championship standings

Note: Only the top five positions are included. Only the best 5 results counted towards the Championship.

References

British Grand Prix
British Grand Prix
British Grand Prix
British Grand Prix